Abell 78 is a planetary nebula located in the constellation of Cygnus. It has a fainter halo consisting mostly hydrogen, and an inner elliptical ring that is mostly made of helium.

The central star of the planetary nebula has a spectral type of [WC5], similar to that of a carbon-rich Wolf–Rayet star.

Gallery

References

External links
 
 https://www.astronomy-mall.com/Adventures.In.Deep.Space/abellcat.htm
 NOAO>Outreach>Planetary Nebula Sampler: Abell 78 

Abell 78
78
Cygnus (constellation)